Hugo Alexander Speer (born 17 March 1968) is an English actor and director.

Early life and education
Hugo Speer was born in Harrogate in the then West Riding of Yorkshire and educated at Harrogate Grammar School. He studied acting at the Arts Educational Schools, London.

Career

Acting
Speer began his acting career appearing in the TV series McCallum, The Bill, and Heartbeat. He played a minor role in the film Bhaji on the Beach before his first notable appearance as Guy in the film The Full Monty. Following this film's worldwide success he went on to appear in Swing (1999), Deathwatch and The Interpreter (playing Nicole Kidman's brother). However, most of his work has been on TV, including sitcom Men Behaving Badly, dramas Clocking Off, The Last Detective, Boudica (2003), and The Rotters' Club (2005), as well as the 2005 BBC adaptation of Dickens' Bleak House. In 2006, he appeared in the postal worker drama Sorted. In 2008, he starred alongside Martine McCutcheon in Echo Beach. In 2011 he played a repairman whose repairs "come to life" in the supernatural drama Haven, based on a Stephen King story. Speer also provides narration for ITV series, Cops with Cameras, Channel 5's The Bachelor, Channel 4 series 999: What's Your Emergency? and the BBC series Seaside Rescue.
He appears as John Foster in the penultimate and final episodes of the fourth series of Skins.

Hugo Speer also narrated a factual programme on Discovery HD called Gold Divers, and Alaska: The Last Frontier.

Since 2010 he has played the lead character of DCI John Stone in eight series of the BBC Radio 4 police drama Stone.  From 2013 to 2014 he starred as Inspector Valentine in the new version of Father Brown on BBC TV in the first series and the first episode of the second series.  He made a return appearance in the 2020 episode 8.10 "The Tower of Lost Souls"

Starting in 2014, Speer appeared as Captain Treville in The Musketeers. The series concluded in 2016.

Since 2018 he has played the character Lucius in the historical fantasy drama series Britannia, which is produced by Sky Atlantic and Amazon Prime.

Directing
In 2010 Hugo Speer made his directorial début with the short film MAM starring Josie Lawrence, Paul Barber and Ronan Carter. The family drama about a 12-year-old boy was scripted by Vivienne Harvey. It was produced by Vigo Films and shot mostly in Sheffield.

Personal life
On 19 February 2015, Speer married Glaswegian actress, writer and director Vivienne Harvey.

In 2009, Speer was involved in a car accident that saw him crash his BMW into a traffic island while driving after drinking over the legal limit. He was returning from a wake.  No one was hurt in the incident and Speer was banned from driving for eighteen months.

Speer moved to London after his success in The Full Monty and lived there for fifteen years but moved back to his native North Yorkshire.  His pastimes include falconry, walking and music.  He is a supporter of Leeds United.

He is friends with fellow actor Andrew Scarborough, whom he worked with in the Hearts and Bones for two series.  Speer and Scarborough have known each other since they were children.

In July 2022, Speer was sacked from a planned follow-up television version of The Full Monty made by Disney+ following allegations of "inappropriate conduct". A spokesperson for the actor said Speer denies the allegations and will challenge them.

Filmography

Film

Television

References

External links
 

1968 births
People educated at the Arts Educational Schools
English male film actors
English male television actors
Living people
Outstanding Performance by a Cast in a Motion Picture Screen Actors Guild Award winners
Actors from Harrogate
Male actors from Yorkshire
English male radio actors
English film directors
20th-century English male actors
21st-century English male actors
People educated at Harrogate Grammar School